Tooth & Nail Records is a Christian rock record label founded by Brandon Ebel in California in November 1993. The label later moved to Seattle, Washington where it is situated today. It is home to many well-known musical acts, including Underoath, Hawk Nelson, Emery, The Almost, FM Static, Family Force 5, Anberlin, and MxPx.

Tooth & Nail's first album released was Wish for Eden's Pet the Fish, which was produced by Michael Knott and originally slated to be released by Blonde Vinyl.  Subsequent releases from The Juliana Theory, MxPx, and Starflyer 59 made Tooth & Nail a strong force in Christian music circles, as well as a niche underground subculture in itself. Prior to forming Tooth & Nail, Ebel worked for the Christian label Frontline.

Overview
Eight Tooth & Nail-affiliated albums have been RIAA-certified as Gold for sales of 500,000 or more copies. The label saw one of its greatest successes when Underoath's Define the Great Line debuted at No. 2 on the Billboard 200 in 2006.

The label also released a limited edition hard cover book, with the proceeds going to benefit Music Cares.

RIAA gold certifications

Nominations and awards

Structure
Tooth & Nail contains multiple imprints, each catering to a different genre of music:

 BEC Recordings mostly includes artists in the mainstream sect of commercial Christian rock such as Kutless and Jeremy Camp, with some exceptions (such as hip hop artists KJ-52 and Manafest).
 Solid State Records distributes metal and hardcore albums by artists such as Living Sacrifice, Demon Hunter, Haste the Day, Underoath and August Burns Red.
 Plastiq Musiq (founded by Ronnie Martin of Joy Electric) primarily signed electronic music artists. Tooth & Nail entered a partnership to distribute Plastiq Musiq albums in 1998 and 1999. Plastiq Musiq continues to release albums independently.
 Fugitive Recordings primarily is made up of artists marketed outside of the Christian market, including Denison Witmer, The Presidents of the United States of America, and Young London.
 The label acquired Takehold Records, an independent record label, in 2002. This acquisition brought several bands to Tooth & Nail including Underoath, Further Seems Forever, Few Left Standing and Narcissus.

On March 13, 2013, it was announced that Brandon Ebel had sold the entire Tooth & Nail music catalog to Capitol Christian Music Group (formerly EMI Christian Music Group) and by doing so was able to buy back the 50% stake in Tooth & Nail formerly owned by EMI making it an independent record label. It will retain the rights to all future releases with a new distributor, RED Distribution.

Label artists

Current 

 Acceptance
 Anchor & Braille
 Alexander Fairchild
 Artifex Pereo
 CIVILIAN
 Copeland
 Death Therapy
 Deep Al Brindle
 Disciple
Emery
 Empty Isles
 Aaron Gillespie
 Hearts Like Lions
 Idle Threat
 John Van Deusen
 Kids
 Le Voyageur
 LOYALS
 Mae
 Make Sure
 Mantric
 Mike Mains & The Branches
 Mirours
 Tyson Motsenbocker
 Off Road Minivan
 Paradise Now
 Salt Creek
 Slick Shoes
 Aaron Sprinkle
 Tigerwine
 Valleyheart
 We Are the City
 The Welcome Wagon

source:

Former: active 

 Abandoned Pools
 Anberlin (currently on Equal Vision Records)
 As Cities Burn (currently on Equal Vision Records)
 The Blamed (reunited and currently independent)
 Blank Books
 Bleach (currently active)
 Blindside (currently unsigned)
 Brave Saint Saturn (signed to Department of Biophysics Records)
 Children 18:3
 The Classic Crime (currently on BC Music)
 Corey Crowder (currently unsigned)
 Craig's Brother (currently on Takeover Records)
 Crash Rickshaw (side project for members of Project 86)
 Damien Jurado
 Danielson (currently on Secretly Canadian)
 The Dingees (officially changed their name to Peg and the Rejected)
 Discover America (currently on Lujo Records)
 Dogwood (currently on Roadside Records)
 The Drawing Room (side project of Thousand Foot Krutch)
 Everdown (reunited, two new demos on MySpace)
 Family Force 5 (currently on Transparent Media Group / Word Records)
 Fighting Jacks
 Focused (unsigned)
 The Fold (independent)
 Further Seems Forever (currently on Rise Records; members became part of Dashboard Confessional, Action Reaction and Fields Forever)
 Goodnight Star (currently on Miniature Records)
 Hawk Nelson (currently on Fair Trade Services)
 Holland (changed name to The Lonely Hearts; currently unsigned)
 Hyland
 The Huntingtons (reunited)
 Icon for Hire (independent)
 The Juliana Theory (currently on Equal Vision Records)
 Kings Kaleidoscope (currently on Rainbow Records)
 Klank (indepMende the)
 The Letter Black (currently on EMP Label Group)
 The Lonely Hearts
 Love & Death
 Luxury (currently on Northern Records)
 Matt & Toby (currently on BC Music)
 Mike Knott
 MxPx (currently on Rock City Recordings)
 Nine Lashes (currently on BEC Recordings)
 Norway (independent)
 Overcome (currently on Facedown Records)
 Pedro the Lion (David Bazan)
 P.O.D. (currently on Universal Music Group)
 Project 86 (independent)
 Rocky Loves Emily (currently unsigned)
 Ruth
 Sainthood Reps (currently on No Sleep Records)
 Search the City (currently unsigned)
 Seventh Day Slumber (currently on BEC Recordings)
 Since October
 Spoken (currently on Artery Recordings)
 States (currently recording a second album)
 Starflyer 59 (currently on Velvet Blue Music)
 Stavesacre (limited activity, members in Neon Horse)
 Surrogate (Independent)
 Swimming with Dolphins (currently unsigned)
 Sullivan (currently on Spartan Records)
 Thousand Foot Krutch (independent)
 The Crucified
 The Wednesdays (Currently with Thorp Records)
 Underoath (currently on Fearless Records)
 Write This Down (currently unsigned)

Former: disbanded 

 A Dream Too Late
 Ace Troubleshooter (members now in Relient K and My Red Hot Nightmare)
 All Wound Up
 The Almost
 And Then There Were None (members now in Young London / Contact)
 AP2 (Contributors continue as lvl and Celldweller, among others)
 Blenderhead (One member now in The Out Circuit)
 Blessed by a Broken Heart (One member now in Still Remains)
 Bloodshed (members now in My Compatriots, Justice Constantine and B is Bridgie)
 Born Blind
 The Brothers Martin (One-time Project)
 Calibretto 13 (members now in Harley Poe, Everything, Now!, Divebomber and Encourager)
 CHATTERbOX (members formed Stavesacre)
 The Cootees (Former side project for members of MXPX, Ninety Pound Wuss, and Slick Shoes)
  Crux
 The Deadlines (members now in The Bullies, The Escape, Haunted Bayou, and Kisses Lose Their Charm)
 Delta Haymax
 The Deluxtone Rockets
 Don't Know (Members have formed Blenderhead)
 Driver Eight (members have played with Theft, Fastball, Paloalto and Golden State)
 Element 101 (members formed ActionReaction)
 Falling Up (Independent)
 Fanmail (members in Radio Saints and My Compatriots)
 Fine China (members now in The Foxglove Hunt)
 Focal Point (One member formed Training for Utopia and is now in Demon Hunter)
 For Love Not Lisa (members have started Puller)
 Frodus (members formed The Out Circuit, The Black Sea, Decahedron, Frantic Mantis, The Dillinger Escape Plan and The Cassettes; and Shelby Cinca now records as a solo artist)
 
 Ghoti Hook
 Hangnail
 Havalina (members now in Matt Death and the New Intellectuals)
 Holland (members started The Lonely Hearts. One member joined Demon Hunter)
 House of Wires
 Joe Christmas (members in Summer Hymns)
 Jonezetta
 Lucerin Blue
 mewithoutYou
 Morella's Forest
 Neon Horse (inactive side-project of members of Stavesacre, Starflyer 59, and Project 86; members now in White Lighter)
 New Empire
 Ninety Pound Wuss (members are now in Raft of Dead Monkeys and Suffering and the Hideous Thieves)
 The O.C. Supertones
 Off the Record
 Outer Circle
 Pep Squad
 Plankeye (members have formed Fielding and Fanmail)
 Poor Old Lu (members have formed Fair, Rose Blossom Punch, and perform solo)
 Puller
 Queens Club
 Roadside Monument (members have formed Unwed Sailor, Raft of Dead Monkeys, and Suffering and the Hideous Thieves)
 Rob Walker
 Royal
 Sal Paradise
 Sent by Ravens
 Shorthanded
 Showbread
 Side Walk Slam
 Slow Coming Day
 Sometime Sunday (members now in Tragedy Ann)
 Squad Five-O (reunited for one-off shows in 2012 and 2017)
 Strongarm (members now in Further Seems Forever)
 Terminal (members now in Alive in Wild Paint, Oh, Sleeper)
 Sunsets for Julia
 Too Bad Eugene
 Twothirtyeight (Chris Staples formed Discover America and performs solo)
 Unashamed
 The Undecided
 Upside Down Room
 Value Pac (Members in Radio Saints)
 Velour 100
 Waking Ashland (Jonathan Jones went solo Immortal Records and also formed We Shot the Moon)
 Watashi Wa (members formed Eager Seas, then disbanded; members now in Lakes, and Briertone)
 We Are the Becoming (members are now part of Project 86)
 Wish for Eden

Former: On hiatus or inactive 

 Bon Voyage
 Capital Lights
 Dead Poetic
 A Dream Too Late
 Far-Less
 FM Static (side project of Thousand Foot Krutch)
 Halo Friendlies
 I Am Empire (members in Talkie and Disciple)
 Ivoryline
 Joy Electric (currently on EEP Society, performing as Said Fantasy)
 Mortal (Jerome Fontamillas now in Switchfoot)
 The River Bends
 Run Kid Run
 Secret and Whisper
 The Send
 The Wedding
 XXI

See also
 Tooth & Nail Records Discography
 List of record labels

References

External links
 

Companies based in Seattle
Record labels established in 1993
Alternative rock record labels
American record labels
Christian record labels
Punk record labels
Universal Music Group